JoAnn Marie Burkholder (born 1953) is an American professor of aquatic ecology at the North Carolina State University, Raleigh. She was responsible for identifying the cause, a dinoflagellate Pfiesteria piscicida and its toxins, of mass deaths of fish that posed a public health hazard. Her studies also helped in improving legislation to control pollution and eutrophication.

Early life 
Burkholder was born in 1953 in Rockford, Illinois.

Education 
Burkholder received a bachelor's degree from Iowa State University in 1975 followed by an MS from University of Rhode Island (1981) and a Ph.D. from Michigan State University in 1986.

Career 
Burkholder investigated fish deaths in a laboratory and found that the cause of that and deaths in North Carolina rivers were due to a dinoflagellate Pfiesteria piscicida which was normally found in the bottom sediment where they feed on organic debris normally but infect fish during migrator runs. The toxins from the dinoflagellate also affect humans, causing skin irritation, breathing difficulties and memory loss. The fish-killing forms of Pfiesteria tended to be associated with high nutrient flows into waters from agricultural and urban waste. The identity of the organism causing the fish kill and the circumstances under which it occurs led to a big public debate as well as within the biological community and was the subject of a book And the Waters Turned to Blood (1997) by Rodney Barker. Her research led to improvements in laws to control non-point pollution.

Burkholder received the Scientific Freedom and Responsibility Award from the American Association for the Advancement of Science in 1998.

References

External links 
 The Cell from Hell

1953 births
Iowa State University alumni
American limnologists
North Carolina State University faculty
Women ecologists
Living people
Women limnologists